The testaceous white-back (Coleophora albicosta) is a moth of the family Coleophoridae. It is found in most of western Europe.

The wingspan is about 14 mm. Head pale ochreous, sides whitish. Antennae white, ringed with fuscous, basal joint ochreous-tinged, with rough spreading scales. Forewings light ochreous-yellowish, sprinkled with light fuscous, especially towards costa ; a white costal streak from base to near apex ; a white line in disc from before middle to termen, one along fold, and one along dorsum to apex. Hindwings grey.

Adults are on wing from June to July. They fly by day, but also sometimes come to light at night.

The larvae feed on Ulex europaeus, at first on green seeds inside a seedpod. It then lives in a detached sepal rolled into a case, which it attaches to the side of a seedpod and bores in to feed on the seeds. Finally, it diapauses full-fed in a silk case in a dead flower and pupates in the overwintering case.

Gallery

References

External links

 UKmoths

albicosta
Moths described in 1828
Moths of Europe
Taxa named by Adrian Hardy Haworth